Lieutenant General Ahsan Azhar Hayat Khan is a retired three-star rank Army General.

Early life
He was born in 1952 to a family belonging to the Khattar Tribe in Wah, Pakistan. He served as Pakistan's ambassador to Jordan. He was appointed in 2013 and served until 2015.

Military career
Hayat had served as the Commandant of the Pakistan Military Academy, IG Training & Evaluation and Commander V Corps.

He also attended Hamid Gul's and Guls wife's funeral

See also
V Corps (Pakistan)
Jordan-Pakistan relations

References

Living people
1952 births
Punjabi people
Pakistani generals
Ambassadors of Pakistan to Jordan
Ahsan
People from Attock District